List of rivers in Roraima (Brazilian State).

The list is arranged by drainage basin, with respective tributaries indented under each larger stream's name and ordered from downstream to upstream. Roraima is located entirely within the Amazon Basin, most of the state is within the Branco River sub-watershed.

By Drainage Basin 

 Amazon River (Pará, Amazonas)
 Uatumã River (Amazonas)
 Jatapu River
 Rio Negro
 Jauaperi River
 Macucuaú River
 Alalaú River
 Branquinho River
 Trairi River
 Branco River
 Xeriuini River
 Novo River 
 Itapará River
 Catrimani River
 Pacu River
 Arapari River
 Jundiá River
 Lôbo d'Almada River
 Água Boa do Univini River
 Capivara River
 Anauá River
 Barauana River
 Itã River
 Barauaninha River
 Caroaebe River
 Novo River
 Ajarani River
 Cachorro River
 Mucajaí River
 Apiaú River
 Quitauau River
 Cauamé River
 Uraricoera River
 Parimé River
 Cauaruau River
 Paricarana River
 Amajari River
 Ereo River
 Acari River
 Pacu River
 Furo Santa Rosa
 Traida River
 Uraricaá River
 Coimim River
 Ericó River
 Tucutol River
 Aracacá River
 Auari River
 Uauaris River
 Parima River
 Uatatas River
 Tacutu River
 Surumu River
 Cotingo River
 Quinó River
 Panari River
 Miang River
 Xaparu River
 Viruaquim River
 Maú River
 Maracani River
 Uailan River
 Canã River
 Caju River
 Arraia River
 Urubu River
 Jufari River
 Preto River

Alphabetically 

 Acari River
 Água Boa do Univini River
 Ajarani River
 Alalaú River
 Amajari River
 Anauá River
 Apiaú River
 Aracacá River
 Arapari River
 Arraia River
 Auari River
 Barauana River
 Barauaninha River
 Branco River
 Branquinho River
 Cachorro River
 Caju River
 Canã River
 Capivara River
 Caroaebe River
 Catrimani River
 Cauamé River
 Cauaruau River
 Coimim River
 Cotingo River
 Ereo River
 Ericó River
 Furo Santa Rosa
 Itã River
 Itapará River
 Jatapu River
 Jauaperi River
 Jufari River
 Jundiá River
 Lôbo d'Almada River
 Macucuaú River
 Maracani River
 Maú River
 Miang River
 Mucajaí River
 Rio Negro
 Novo River
 Novo River 
 Pacu River
 Pacu River
 Panari River
 Paricarana River
 Parima River
 Parimé River
 Preto River
 Quinó River
 Quitauau River
 Surumu River
 Tacutu River
 Traida River
 Trairi River
 Tucutol River
 Uailan River
 Uatatas River
 Uauaris River
 Uraricaá River
 Uraricoera River
 Urubu River
 Viruaquim River
 Xaparu River
 Xeriuini River

References
 Map from Ministry of Transport

 
Roraima
Environment of Roraima